The Colorado Railroad Museum is a non-profit railroad museum.

The museum was established in 1959 to preserve a record of Colorado's flamboyant railroad era, particularly the state's pioneering narrow-gauge mountain railroads.

Facilities

The museum building is a replica of an 1880s-style railroad depot. Exhibits feature original photographs by pioneer photographers such as William Henry Jackson and Louis Charles McClure, as well as paintings by Howard L Fogg, Otto Kuhler, Ted Rose and other artists. Locomotives and railroad cars modeled in the one inch scale by Herb Votaw are also displayed. A bay window contains a reconstructed depot telegrapher's office, complete with a working telegraph sounder.

The lower level of the museum building contains an exhibition hall which features seasonal and traveling displays on railroading history. The lower level also contains the Denver HO Model Railroad Club's "Denver and Western" operating HO and HOn3 scale model train layout that represent Colorado's rail history in miniature.

The Robert W. Richardson Library houses over 10,000 rare historic photographs, along with other reference materials such as timetables, maps, employee records and engineering documents about Colorado railroads.

Collection

The museum has a large collection of  narrow-gauge rolling stock and provides narrow-gauge train rides on special event days known as "Steam Up days".

The museum also has ex-Denver and Rio Grande Western Railroad No. 683, a coal-burning 2-8-0 "Consolidation" type steam locomotive built by the Baldwin Locomotive Works in 1890, builders number 11207. It is the only surviving  steam locomotive from the Denver & Rio Grande Western Railroad.
 
All of the railroad equipment is displayed outdoors. Display tracks are complete with a rare three-way stub switch, dual gauge track and switches and century-old switch stands. These tracks hold over 100 historic narrow and standard gauge locomotives and cars. The  oval of  gauge track is used by trains on operating days.

The museum's roster contains the following notable pieces of rolling stock:

Steam locomotives

Diesel locomotives
Denver & Rio Grande Western Davenport 0-4-0 #50
Denver & Rio Grande Western EMD F9A #5771 & F9B #5762
Denver & Rio Grande Western EMD GP30 #3011
Denver & Rio Grande Western EMD SD40T-2 #5401. Donated to the museum in 2018.

Passenger cars
Atchison Topeka & Santa Fe Observation Car Navajo
Chicago Burlington & Quincy Business Car No. 96
Colorado Midland Observation Car No. 111
Denver & Rio Grande Western Coach No. 284
Denver & Rio Grande Western Railway Post Office Car No. 60
Union Pacific Coach No. 5442
Union Pacific Diner No. 4801
Uintah Combination Coach No. 50

Special equipment   
• Manitou & Pikes Peak Cog Railway #1 (Cog locomotive)

• West Side Lumber Company #12 (Shay locomotive)

• West Side Lumber Company #14 (Shay locomotive)
Chicago Burlington & Quincy snow plow No. 205065
Colorado & Southern rotary snow plow No. 99201
Rio Grande Southern "Galloping Goose" No. 2
Rio Grande Southern "Galloping Goose" No. 6
Rio Grande Southern "Galloping Goose" No. 7

See also

List of heritage railroads in the United States

References

External links

Denver Garden Railway Society website
Denver HO Model Railroad Club website

Heritage railroads in Colorado
Model railway shows and exhibitions
Museums established in 1959
Museums in Golden, Colorado
Non-profit organizations based in Colorado
Publishing companies of the United States
Railroad museums in Colorado
Railroad roundhouses in Colorado
1959 establishments in Colorado